The Wonthaggi Formation is an informal geological formation in Victoria, Australia whose strata date back to the Early Cretaceous. It is part of the Strzelecki Group within the Gippsland Basin. Dinosaur remains are among the fossils that have been recovered from the formation. It is partially equivalent to the Eumeralla Formation.

Geology 
The Wonthaggi Formation was deposited within the extensional rift valley formed between Australia and Antarctica. The lithology primarily consists of fluvially deposited siliciclastics derived from volcanic rocks of the Whitsunday Silicic Large Igneous Province to the East, with suggestions that the sediments either originated from braided river and sheet flood deposits, or meandering river systems on vegetated floodplains. The age of the formation is thought to be Valanginian to Barremian, with the Flat Rocks site being late Barremian (~125 Ma) in age, older than the sediments from the Eumeralla Formation, which are thought to be Aptian-Albian in age.

Vertebrate paleofauna
Indeterminate ornithopod remains are present in Victoria, Australia. Indeterminate megaraptorid remains are present in Victoria, Australia.

See also 
 List of dinosaur-bearing rock formations
 South Polar region of the Cretaceous

References 

Geologic formations of Australia
Cretaceous System of Australia
Early Cretaceous Australia
Valanginian Stage
Hauterivian Stage
Barremian Stage
Aptian Stage
Sandstone formations
Siltstone formations
Fluvial deposits
Fossiliferous stratigraphic units of Oceania
Paleontology in Victoria
Geology of Victoria (Australia)